Atlantic was a steamboat that sank on Lake Erie after a collision with the steamer Ogdensburg on 20 August 1852, with the loss of at least 150 but perhaps as many as 300 lives. The loss of life made this disaster, in terms of loss of life from the sinking of a single vessel, the fifth-worst tragedy in the history of the Great Lakes.

Construction and Career
Atlantic was built in 1848 or 1849 in Newport, Michigan, now called Marine City, by J. L. Wolverton. She had 85 staterooms and a capacity of over 300 passengers.

Atlantic was owned by E. B. Ward of Detroit, or E. B. and S. Ward of St. Clair, Michigan and operated by the Michigan Central Railroad. She was put into service making trips between Buffalo, New York and Detroit, Michigan; she set a speed record of 16 and a half hours for a trip between the two cities.

Final voyage
On the afternoon of 19 August 1852, Atlantic left Buffalo, heading for Detroit, under the command of Captain J. Byron Pettey. Every cabin was full, and over 250 passengers were on the deck, many Norwegian, Irish, or other European immigrants. Atlantic stopped at Erie, Pennsylvania to pick up even more Norwegian immigrants waiting for ships to take them west to Detroit. Around half of the immigrants waiting were taken aboard; roughly seventy had to be left behind due to lack of space. Atlantic was now dangerously overcrowded, with 500-600 people aboard; the ship's clerk did not keep an exact count. Baggage was piled on the deck, and passengers stayed wherever they could, including on the uppermost hurricane deck and the roof of Atlantic cabin. At 11 pm on 19 August 1852, Atlantic left Erie. The lake was calm; the sources are unclear about the level of visibility, with reports indicating everything from a light mist to a heavy fog.

Meanwhile, the new propeller steamer Ogdensburg was heading the other way, from Cleveland, Ohio, to Ogdensburg, New York, carrying a load of wheat. At 2 am on 20 August 1852, the paths of the two ships crossed near Long Point. On board Ogdensburg, the first mate, Degrass McNeil, was on duty. He spotted lights from Atlantic but was sure that Ogdensburg would pass at least a half mile ahead of the other ship. But then Atlantic changed course, turning north as though trying to pass in front of Ogdensburg. McNeil ordered Ogdensburg engines reversed and the ship turned to port, and since Ogdensburg steam whistle was broken, McNeil ran out onto the ship's deck and yelled to try and get the other ship to turn to starboard.

McNeil's actions came too late. Ogdensburg rammed Atlantic on the port side, forward of the paddlewheel, cutting into Atlantic side down to the waterline. Ogdensburg reversed and backed away from Atlantic, while Atlantic continued away under full steam. Perhaps reassured by Atlantic steaming away, McNeil steered Ogdensburg back onto its regular course. Many passengers on Atlantic were awakened by the collision, but the crew of Atlantic made no effort to alert all the passengers. Water flowing in through the hole in Atlantic soon flooded the boilers, bringing the ship to a halt. The passengers and crew began to panic, many throwing anything that would float over the side of the ship before jumping over the side themselves, where many drowned. An attempt was made to launch Atlantic three boats; one capsized, and Captain Petty suffered a concussion while lowering another, leaving him unable to provide any more assistance. The two other boats were lowered, carrying mostly crew members. The bow of Atlantic began to sink, but the stern was kept above water by air trapped inside the ship.

Meanwhile, the crew of Ogdensburg realized that Atlantic was in trouble, either because Ogdensburg Captain Richardson reached that conclusion after examining the damage to his ship, or because the crew of Ogdensburg, after stopping their ship to check for damage, heard screams coming from the sinking Atlantic. Ogdensburg turned around and found the half-sunk Atlantic ten minutes later; her crew took survivors off Atlantic stern and rescued others from the water. Shortly after Ogdensburg took the last survivors off of the deck of Atlantic, Atlantic sank completely. The ship did not carry detailed passenger lists, but estimates range from at least 130 lives lost up to 300 lives lost, with an estimated death toll of 250 being common.

Aftermath
Ogdensburg steamed to the nearest port, which was Erie, Pennsylvania. While there, a group of passengers met and issued a resolution. In it, they condemned the incompetence of the officers of Atlantic with the exception of the clerk, Mr. Givon. They also spoke out against the poor quality of the life preservers on Atlantic and commended the captain of Ogdensburg for returning to the scene.

Among the survivors of the disaster was Henry T. Titus, future founder of Titusville, Florida.

The wreck
Atlantic rests mostly intact under  of water near Long Point. That fall, diver John Green was hired by American Express to dive the wreck and retrieve Atlantic safe and money known to be in a cabin, but his attempts failed. In 1855, Green returned with the schooner Yorktown, located the safe, and moved it out to the deck of Atlantic. But Green contracted a near-fatal case of the bends and was taken to a hospital; he was in recovery until the summer of 1856. When he returned to the wreck on 1 July 1856, he found the safe and money were gone. Another diver, Eliot Harrington, had found them both and hauled them to the surface. $36,700 was taken from Atlantic safe, at a time when a decent wage was a dollar a day. American Express went to court for the money; the ending settlement gave Harrington and the four others who worked with him a bit under $2,000 each, with American Express taking the rest.

The legal battle over the cause of the wreck went to the United States Supreme Court, who ruled that both ships were at fault. In 1867, the Western Wrecking Company was formed to try and raise Atlantic, but this plan was abandoned two years later.

The wreck was rediscovered in 1984 by Port Dover, Ontario diver Michael Lynn Fletcher; the aquatic plants formerly covering the wreck were largely eaten away by zebra mussels. In 1991, a California-based diving company, Mar-Dive, announced that they had found Atlantic, and paid the state of Ohio $14,000 to reform the Western Wrecking Company. But since Atlantic rests inside Canadian waters, the government of Ontario moved to prevent the removal of artifacts from Atlantic, taking the issue to Ontario divisional court. The judge ruled that Atlantic belonged to Ontario. To protect the wreck, an electronic monitoring system was installed that will alert the Ontario Provincial Police if a vessel stays for too long above the wreck.

Notes

References

1849 ships
Paddle steamers of the United States
Shipwrecks of Lake Erie
Passenger ships of the United States
Maritime incidents in August 1852
Ships sunk in collisions
Ships built in Marine City, Michigan